NLR - until No Leprosy Remains, formerly known as Netherlands Leprosy Relief is a non-governmental organization, established on 30 March 1967 in Amsterdam by Ciska Anten and Dick Leiker. The foundation promotes and supports the eradication of leprosy and all its consequences in seven regions where the disease is endemic. NLR was a founding member of the International Federation of Anti-Leprosy Associations (ILEP), and sponsors over 100 projects in about 20 countries. The association helped create (and maintain) a leprosy-information service (Infolep), which may be accessed from the ILEP website.

The NLR, initially focused on Tanzania, expanded its operations to other countries in Africa, Asia and Latin America. In 2019, No Leprosy Remains was active in Mozambique, India, Indonesia, Nepal and Brazil .

The NLR mission is:

 Early detection of leprosy patients;
 Early treatment and cure of leprosy patients;
 The medical, economic and social rehabilitation of leprosy patients;
 Scientific research into breakthroughs in leprosy control.
In 2017, the Leprosy Foundation received 9.3 million euros from the Dream Fund of the National Postcode Lottery for their "Stop leprosy infection!" project. Approximately 500,000 people will be treated preventively and the number of new infections in the project areas are expected to have fallen by 50%.

References

External links
NLR - until No Leprosy Remains
Leprastichting

Organizations established in 1967
Health charities in the Netherlands
Leprosy organizations
1967 establishments in the Netherlands